Clementina Vélez (9 May 1946 – 26 February 2020) was a Colombian doctor, academic and politician, who served as an MP and city councillor of Cali.

References

1946 births
2020 deaths
Colombian women in politics